Gorantla may refer to:

Geography

Andhra Pradesh, India 

Gorantla, Anantapur district, a village in the Anantapur district, Andhra Pradesh, India
Gorantla, Guntur a suburb of Guntur city, Andhra Pradesh, India
Gorantla, Sattenapalle mandal a village in Sattenapalle mandal, Guntur district, Andhra Pradesh, India
Gorantla, Kurnool district a village in the Kurnool district, Andhra Pradesh, India

Telangana, India 
Gorentla, Suryapet district, a village in the Suryapet district, Telangana, India

People 
Gorantla Venkanna, philanthropist, lover and patron of Sanskrit language